Donje Ljubinje is a village in Prizren Municipality, Kosovo. It is located in the historical region of Sredačka župa. According to the 2011 population census, the village had 1,227 inhabitants, with 1,178 (96%) being Bosniaks.

The village attracts media attention because of the centuries-old tradition of bride decoration among local Bosniak population. This tradition, once widespread in the area, is now only performed by one elder woman from Donje Ljubinje named Sejdefa LJimani.

Notes

References

Villages in Prizren